"Copperhead Road" is a song written and recorded by American singer-songwriter Steve Earle. It was released in 1988 as the first single and title track from his third studio album of the same name. The song reached number 10 on the U.S. Billboard Mainstream Rock Tracks chart, and was Earle's highest-peaking song to date on that chart in the United States. The song has sold 1.1 million digital copies in the United States as of September 2017.

Content
The song's narrator is named John Lee Pettimore III, whose father and grandfather were both active in moonshine making and bootlegging in rural Johnson County, Tennessee. Pettimore's grandfather visited town only rarely, in order to buy supplies for a still he had set up in a hollow along Copperhead Road. Pettimore's father hauled the moonshine to Knoxville each week in an old police cruiser he bought at a surplus auction. According to a family story, a Revenue Man once confronted John Sr. on Copperhead Road, intent on apprehending him for his moonshine activities, but never returned. John Jr. himself is killed in a fiery car crash on the same road while driving to Knoxville with a weekly shipment.

Pettimore enlists in the Army on his birthday, believing he will soon be drafted, and serves two tours of duty in Vietnam. Once he returns home, he decides to use the Copperhead Road land to grow marijuana, using seeds from Colombia and Mexico. He resolves not to be caught by the DEA using techniques learnt from the Viet Cong.

Influence and legacy
Copperhead Road was an actual road near Mountain City, Tennessee, in an area known to locals as "Big Dry Run" although it has since been renamed Copperhead Hollow Road, owing to theft of road signs bearing the song's name. The song inspired a popular line dance, timed to the same beat, and has been used as the theme music for the Discovery Channel reality series Moonshiners.

The song's blend of country and Southern rock has influenced several artists, including Eric Church, Travis Tritt, Brothers Osborne, Chris Stapleton and Jason Aldean.

Music video
The music video was directed by Tony Vanden Ende and premiered in early 1988.

Chart performance

Other versions
In 2018 American metal band DevilDriver recorded a version of this song on their album "Outlaws 'til the End Vol. 1".

References

1988 singles
Steve Earle songs
Songs written by Steve Earle
Song recordings produced by Tony Brown (record producer)
Songs about alcohol
Songs about roads
Songs about drugs
MCA Records singles
1988 songs